Centro Esportivo Olhodagüense, commonly known as CEO, is a Brazilian professional football club based in Olho d'Água das Flores, Alagoas. It competes in the Campeonato Alagoano Segunda Divisão, the second division of the Alagoas state football league.

History
The club was founded on 2 December 1953. They won the Campeonato Alagoano Second Level in 2011, after beating Penedense in the final and thus they were promoted to the 2012 Campeonato Alagoano.

Recent Season Records

Achievements

 Campeonato Alagoano Second Level:
 Winners (2): 2011 and 2016

Runner-up in 2011: Sport Club Penedense

Runner-up in 2016: Miguelense Futebol Clube

Stadium
Centro Esportivo Olhodagüense play their home games at Estádio Edson Matias. The stadium has a maximum capacity of 3,000 people.

References

Association football clubs established in 1953
Football clubs in Alagoas
1953 establishments in Brazil